Balkinization is a law blog focused on constitutional, First Amendment, and other civil liberties issues. The weblog was created on January 13, 2003 by Jack Balkin, a professor of U.S. constitutional law at Yale Law School. 

Balkinization has been critical of the Bush Administration's record on civil liberties issues in the Global War on Terror following 9/11.  

As of June 2017, the weblog has had approximately 11 million visitors since its creation.

Notable contributors
Notable contributors include:

Ian Ayres
Stephen Griffin
Andrew Koppelman
Marty Lederman
Sanford Levinson
Gerard Magliocca
Rick Pildes
Mark Tushnet

References

External links
Balkinization

Internet properties established in 2003
American political blogs
American legal websites